Omer Adam (born October 22, 1993) is an Israeli singer whose music fuses elements of eastern Mizrahi music (Oriental-Middle Eastern) and Western Pop instrumentation. In 2009, he participated in the seventh season of Kokhav Nolad (in Hebrew כוכב נולד), a popular Idol series show in Israel, but was disqualified because of being underage at the time of application.

Biography
Omer Adam was born in North Carolina, U.S., to an Israeli family residing in the United States. On his paternal side, His father Yaniv Adam is of Mountain Jewish (Kavkazi Jewish) descent, whereas his mother is of Ashkenazi Jewish descent. His father was a special forces officer in the Israel Defense Forces who served as deputy commander of the Shaldag Unit and Battalion 202 of the Paratroopers Brigade. His paternal grandfather Shmuel served as a senior commander in the Israel Border Police. He is also related to General Yekutiel Adam and his son General Udi Adam. When Adam was three years old, the family returned to Israel and settled at moshav Mishmar HaShiv'a. Adam grew up in Israel. During his mandatory national service in the Israel Defense Forces, he served in the Technology and Maintenance Corps.

Kokhav Nolad
In season 7 of the Kokhav Nolad show, Omer Adam sang the following songs: 
Audition: "Aba" (Father) from Shlomi Shabat
Week 1 (June 29, 2009): "Isha ne'emana" (A loyal woman) from Yishai Levi
Week 2 (July 5, 2009): "Tza'ir lanetsakh" (Forever young) from Rami Kleinstein
Week 3 (June 12–13, 2009): "Niguna shel hashkhuna" (The neighborhood's song) from Izhar Cohen (as a duo with Moran Mazuz)
Week 4 (July 19, 2009): "Ma hu ose la" (What does he do to her) from HaGashash HaHiver (as a trio with Re'em Cohen and Hovi Star)
Week 4 (July 20, 2009): "Marlene" from Zohar Argov (originally by Enrico Macias)
Week 5 (July 26, 2009): "Yak'had" (Together) from Kobi Peretz & Ishtar) (as a duo with Vladi Blayberg)
Week 5 (July 27, 2009): "Mima'amkim" (From the depths) from Idan Raichel's Project
Week 6 (August 2, 2009): "Aba" (Father) from Shlomi Shabat
Week 6 (August 3, 2009): "At Vaani" (You and I) from Shlomo Artzi

As a result of his performances in week 6, initially the judges classified him as 3rd of 9 for his "Aba" performance, and 4th of 8 for his "At Vaani" performance.

However a blogger revealed that Adam was just 15 years and 7 months when he applied, while the minimum age is 16. Adam withdrew from the competition mid-way through the season. Zvika Hadar, host of the show, responded by saying: "The important thing is that Omer realized his mistake, apologized and took the right decision. Our role is to provide equal admission to all contestants, we cannot compromise on this case. Many candidates who came for auditions were rejected because of their age." Adam's disqualification was announced officially on August 5, 2009, despite him being one of the favorites to reach the final.

Singing career
Adam enjoyed great popularity despite leaving Kokhav Nolad. He toured the country giving more than 150 performances in less than a year. In late 2009 he released his debut single, called "להיאבד ברוח" ("Lost in the wind"). He followed it up in July 2010 with "חוזה בנשמה" which became the theme song for the television show "חתונת השנה" ("Wedding of the Year") on Israel's Channel 2 station.

In December 2010, he put out an album entitled נמס ממך ("Melting because of you"), including the already released singles in addition to new songs including "נעתי בתוך מעגל" ("I moved in a circle"), "בלילה קר" ("Cold night"), and "לא תדעי דמעה" ("You will not know a tear"). He also included some remixed versions of his songs.

In 2011, he released a second album "מאושרת" ("Happy"). In March 2011 the first hit from the new album was released entitled "בניתי עלייך", followed by "קסם" ("Magic") as a duet with Itzik Kalla (in Hebrew איציק קלה). In May 2011 came his hit "מליון נשיקות" ("Million kisses"), with immense online success, followed by "קרוב אלייך" ("Close to you").

On June 15, 2011, he appeared in a live show attended by thousands in Caesarea Maritima, a venue on the Israeli coast, becoming the youngest artist to be featured as a main artist.

On January 29, 2012, he released his third album ילד טוב ילד רע ("Good boy, bad boy"). The first single from the album was "אל תחפשי", followed by "Meusheret" ("מאושרת") and "Baniti Alayich" ("בניתי עלייך"). He also appeared on a reality television show הסוכנים on the HOT Israeli Entertainment channel (in Hebrew, הוט בידור ישראלי).

In June 2013, his song Tel Aviv תל אביב, featuring Arisa, from his album "מוזיקה ושקט" ("Music and Silence"), was the official anthem of Tel Aviv Pride.

In August 2015 he released his fourth album "I thank" (מודה אני), which became very popular very soon after its release.

Adam performed at the Opening Ceremonies of the 2017 Maccabiah Games on July 6, 2017.

He had the biggest selling song in Israel in the 2017–18 period, measured between Rosh Hashana in successive years, with "Two Crazy People" (שני משוגעים) ahead of their Eurovision 2018 Winner performed by Netta Barzilai. Stav Beger was a key producer in both songs

In 2019, Adam, considered the most popular recording artist in Israel, said that he turned down an offer to appear at that year's Eurovision contest since it would involve working on Shabbat (Jewish Sabbath). While Adam is not traditionally observant, he has made a point in his career of refusing to work on Shabbat.

In November 2020, Adam joined 39 other Israeli artists to record Katan Aleinu, a charity single benefitting hospitals battling the COVID-19 pandemic.

In 2021, he published קאטליה (Cattleya) with the Israeli DJ Skazi. The song samples Kalinka by Ivan Larionov.

Discography

Albums
2010: Namess Mimekh (Melting because of you) | נמס ממך
2012: Good Boy Bad Boy | ילד טוב ילד רע
2013: Music and Silence | מוזיקה ושקט
2015: Modeh Ani | מודה אני
2017: After All These Years | אחרי כל השנים
2020: OMER | עומר
2021 the eight

EP
2019: 5 Boom! | 5 בום

See also
Music of Israel

References

External links
Page on Shiron.net

1993 births
21st-century Israeli male  singers
American emigrants to Israel
Israeli pop singers
Kokhav Nolad contestants
Living people
Israeli Ashkenazi Jews
Israeli people of Mountain Jewish descent
People from Central District (Israel)
Israeli Mizrahi Jews